Anderson Luís (Anderson Luiz) is a Portuguese given name, may refer to:

 Anderson Luís de Azevedo Rodrigues Marques known as Anderson Luís (born 1987), Brazilian footballer, youths internationals in 2007 South American Youth Championship
 Anderson Luiz Gomes Ribeiro, known as Anderson Luiz (born 1982), Brazilian footballer
 Anderson (footballer, born 1988) (born 1988), Brazilian footballer
 Anderson Luís (footballer, born 1988), Anderson Luís Ribeiro Pereira, Brazilian football right-back
 Anderson Luiz Domingos, known as just Anderson (born 1988), Brazilian footballer
 Deco, real name Anderson Luís de Souza (born 1977), naturalized Portuguese footballer
 Luisão, real name Anderson Luís da Silva (born 1981), Brazilian international footballer
 Nenê, real name Anderson Luis de Carvalho (born 1981), Brazilian footballer
 Paquito, real name Anderson Luiz Pinheiro'' (born 1981) Italian–Brazilian footballer

Portuguese masculine given names